Matej Beňuš (born 2 November 1987) is a Slovak slalom canoeist who has competed at the international level since 2002.

He won a silver medal in the C1 event at the 2016 Summer Olympics in Rio de Janeiro. He also won 12 medals at the ICF Canoe Slalom World Championships with nine golds (C1 team: 2009, 2010, 2011, 2013, 2014, 2015, 2017, 2018, 2019), one silver (C1 team: 2022) and two bronzes (C1: 2011, C1 team: 2021). He is a three-time overall world cup champion in the C1 class (2010, 2015, 2019). At the European Championships he won a total of twelve medals (8 golds, 2 silver and 2 bronzes).

Career

Junior
His parents introduced him to this sport at a young age, and he took it up at age 11. His first major international competition was the 2002 World Junior Championships, where he finished 23rd in the C1 category. The following year he competed at the 2003 European Junior Championships, taking ninth place in the individual C1 and sixth place in the team event, with Ján Bátik and Peter Hajdu. He won his first medals in the 2004 season: gold at the European Junior Championships in Krakow in the individual C1 category and two silver medals at the World Junior Championships, in both individual and team events. The 2005 season was his last in the junior category, finishing 8th in the C1 event at the European Junior Championships and 4th in the C1 team event. In 2004, he was named the Junior of the Year and in 2005 the Talent of the Year by the Slovak Canoe Association.

U23
He first competed in the U23 category in 2004, achieving fifth place at the European U23 Championships in C1 team with Alexander Slafkovský and Ján Bátik. Two years later, he finished fifth in individual and seventh in the team event and in 2007 he won his first medal in this category, bronze in C1 in Krakow. He added a silver medal at the 2008 European U23 Championships and gold a year later in Liptovský Mikuláš, both in individual C1 discipline. 2010 season was the last one he was eligible to start in U23 events. He won a silver medal in the individual and bronze in the team C1 competition at the 2010 European U23 Championships in Markkleeberg.

Senior

C1 Individual
His first major international senior competition was the 2007 European Championships, where he finished 15th. He also competed at the 2007 World Championships, finishing 29th. Two years later, he managed to enter the top ten, with the sixth place at the 2009 European and fifth at the 2009 World Championships. In that season, he also achieved his first podium at the World Cup event, finishing third in Bratislava and placed fifth in the final World Cup ranking. 

In 2010 he won his first individual senior medal: silver at the European Championships, when the Slovak canoeists swept all the podium positions. He also became the overall World Cup champion in C1 category. In 2011 he won his first and so far the only individual medal at the World Championships: bronze, on his home whitewater course and won his first World Cup race, placing second in the final ranking. He was also named the 2011 Canoeist of the Year by the Slovak Canoe Association. Between 2010 and 2015 he always finished in top 3 in the final rankings of the World cup, after first and second place in 2010 and 2011 respectively, he was also third in 2012, second in 2013, third again in 2014 and first in 2015. From 2013 to 2016 he always finished in top ten at major championships, with one ninth and two sixth places at the World Championships and two bronze medals (2013 and 2015) and one fifth place at the European level. In 2015, he was once again awarded the title of Slovak Canoeist of the Year. Beňuš finished the 2016 season as the World No. 1 in the C1 event.

His biggest individual success is the silver medal at the 2016 Summer Olympics, where he prolonged Slovak medal streak in this discipline (first five medals in C1 were achieved by Michal Martikán). Beňuš  also competed at the 2020 Summer Olympics, finishing in 6th place in the C1 event.

C1 Team
At the World Senior championships, he has been a part of Slovak team since 2009, together with Martikán and Slafkovský. They have won the gold medal at every World Championship since then, with a total of nine gold medals (surpassing the record previously held by the USA). At the European Senior Championships he first competed in the team event in 2007 with Martikán and Juraj Minčík, immediately winning the gold medal. They repeated this success next year (with Slafkovský instead of Minčík), but finished eighth in 2009. At the 2010 European Championships held in his hometown they won the gold medal again and in 2011 they finished fourth. Over the next five years they won 4 European titles together, with the exception of the 2014 season when Beňuš didn't make the national team selection.

World Cup individual podiums

Personal life
He is married, his wife's name is Ivana and they have three children, Simon, Tobias and Sebastián. His older sister Dana Mann is also a gold medalist from the 2011 ICF Canoe Slalom World Championships in K1 team category, together with Elena Kaliská and Jana Dukátová.

Beňuš is a practicing Roman Catholic who was raised and shaped at Salesian Youth Center in Trnávka neighbourhood of Ružinov, Bratislava.

References

External links
 
 
 
 
 

Living people
Slovak male canoeists
1987 births
Sportspeople from Bratislava
Canoeists at the 2016 Summer Olympics
Olympic canoeists of Slovakia
Olympic silver medalists for Slovakia
Olympic medalists in canoeing
Medalists at the 2016 Summer Olympics
Medalists at the ICF Canoe Slalom World Championships
Canoeists at the 2020 Summer Olympics
Slovak Roman Catholics